The Hungry Five are the five Green Bay, Wisconsin area businessmen who were instrumental in keeping the Green Bay Packers franchise in operation during its early years. They raised funds, incorporated the team as a non-profit corporation, sold stock, established the Green Bay Packers Board of Directors and otherwise promoted the franchise.

The Hungry Five consisted of Curly Lambeau, attorney Andrew B. Turnbull, attorney Gerald Francis Clifford, Dr. W. Webber Kelly and Lee Joannes. Turnbull was the Packers' first president and publisher of the Green Bay Press-Gazette. Joannes was the president for 17 years, helping guide the Packers through the Great Depression, near bankruptcy and a second stock sale. Kelly served one year as president, and also as team physician and as a board member. Clifford served on the Executive Committee for two decades. All have been inducted into the Green Bay Packers Hall of Fame.

Despite their years of service, only coach/player Curly Lambeau was ever paid a salary. “The Hungry Five” nickname was coined, as can best be determined, by Arch Ward, sports editor of the Chicago Tribune, because they always seemed to have their hands out for money, since the franchise was often in financial trouble.

References

Citations

Bibliography

History of the Green Bay Packers